Merulempista digitata is a moth of the family Pyralidae. It is known from China (Gansu, Xinjiang).

The wingspan is 22–27 mm. The head is greyish brown to dark brown. The labial palpus in the male is stronger than in females. The first segment is greyish white, in male mixed with pale ochreous. The second and third segments are brown, mixed with pale ochreous except greyish white dorsally. The thorax and tegula are brown tinged with greyish white except the tegula which are pale reddish brown at the base. The forewings are three times longer than wide, the apex rounded and the termen bluntly oblique. The ground colouration is greyish brown to brownish black, mixed with reddish brown and greyish white. The antemedian line is white, edged with erect black scales along the outside. The hindwings are pale grey.

Etymology
The specific epithet is derived from the Latin digitatus (meaning "having fingers"), in reference to the distal process of the costa.

External links
Review of the genus Merulempista Roesler, 1967 (Lepidoptera, Pyralidae) from China, with description of two new species

Moths described in 2011
Phycitini